Osvaldo Máximo Vieira (1938 – 31 March 1974) was a pioneer of the Bissau-Guinean independence movement and a key military commander during the War of Independence. He was the cousin of Nino Vieira, who would later serve two separate terms as president.

Vieira was one of many early recruits from the so-called "revolutionary petty bourgeoisie", a group which Amílcar Cabral entrusted with instigating the war of independence. His father worked at the Sociedade Comercial Ultramarina, while his grandfather had worked in the postal service, owned land, and was considered a "small intellectual".

Before his revolutionary career, Vieira worked as a pharmacy assistant to Sofia Pomba Guerra, a white Portuguese feminist who was active in the burgeoning independence movements of Guinea-Bissau and Mozambique. In 1961 he, along with nine other young PAIGC fighters, trained at the Army Command College of the Chinese People's Liberation Army in Nanjing, China.

The Osvaldo Vieira International Airport in Bissau is named in his honour.

References

1938 births
1974 deaths
African and Black nationalists
African Party for the Independence of Guinea and Cape Verde politicians
African revolutionaries
Bissau-Guinean military personnel
Bissau-Guinean pan-Africanists